The 2014 elections for the Oregon Legislative Assembly determined the composition of both houses of the state legislature for the 78th Oregon Legislative Assembly (2015–2016 term). The Republican and Democratic primary elections were held on May 20, 2014 with the general election following on November 4, 2014.

The Democratic Party increased its 16-14 majority in the Senate to a supermajority of 18–12. In the House, the Democrats added one more seat and now holds a 35-25 majority.

Oregon State Senate

16 of the State Senate's 30 seats were up for re-election in 2014. Democrats held a 16–14 majority in the 2012 legislative election.

Open seats
District 13: Republican Larry George retired.

Results

The official results are:

Oregon House of Representatives

All 60 seats in the State House of Representatives were up for re-election in 2014. Democrats took a 34-26 majority in the 2012 elections after they picked up a net of four seats.

Open seats
District 2: Republican Tim Freeman was elected to the Douglas County Board of Commissioners.
District 3: Republican Wally Hicks retired.
District 4: Republican Dennis Richardson is the Republican nominee for Governor of Oregon.
District 7: Republican Bruce Hanna retired.
District 16: Democrat Sara Gelser was the Democratic nominee for state Senate in District 8.
District 19: Republican Kevin Cameron resigned when he was appointed to the Marion County Board of Commissioners
District 20: Republican Vicki Berger retired.
District 23: Republican Jim Thompson was defeated in the primary by Mike Nearman.
District 25: Republican Kim Thatcher was the Republican nominee for state Senate in District 13.
District 29: Democrat Ben Unger retired.
District 34: Democrat Chris Harker retired.
District 41: Democrat Carolyn Tomei retired.
District 42: Democrat Jules Bailey was elected to the Multnomah County Board of Commissioners.
District 50: Democrat Greg Matthews retired.
District 54: Republican Jason Conger ran for the Republican nomination for U.S. Senator from Oregon.
District 58: Republican Bob Jenson retired.

Results

See also 
 77th Oregon Legislative Assembly (2013–2014)
 78th Oregon Legislative Assembly (2015–2016)

References

Legislature
Oregon Legislative Assembly elections